Fembe, or Agala, is a Trans–New Guinea language of New Guinea, spoken in the plains east of the Strickland River.

References

Languages of Western Province (Papua New Guinea)
East Strickland languages